James Blair (8 August 1883 – 24 March 1913) was a Scottish professional footballer who played as a half back or inside forward.

Career
Born in Dumfries, Blair played for Kilmarnock, Arsenal, Manchester City, Bradford City and Stockport County. For Arsenal, he made 13 appearances in the Football League. For Manchester City, he made 76 appearances in the Football League; he also made 5 FA Cup appearances. For Bradford City, he made 39 appearances in the Football League; he also made three FA Cup appearances.

Suicide
Blair committed suicide in 1913. He was found by his brother after slitting his own throat at home. He had reportedly been despondent over ill health and being unable to take part in the Easter matches.

Sources

References

1883 births
1913 deaths
Scottish footballers
Footballers from Dumfries
Kilmarnock F.C. players
Arsenal F.C. players
Manchester City F.C. players
Bradford City A.F.C. players
Stockport County F.C. players
English Football League players
Association football defenders
Association football inside forwards
Suicides by sharp instrument in the United Kingdom
1913 suicides